Christian Prokop (born 24 December 1978) is a German handball retired professional player and current coach. He last served as the German national team head coach.

References

1978 births
Living people
German male handball players
German handball coaches
Handball-Bundesliga players
People from Köthen (Anhalt)
Handball coaches of international teams
Sportspeople from Saxony-Anhalt